Kim Ryong-yon (1916 – 20 March 2008) was a North Korean politician and military officer who held the rank of Vice Marshal.

Biography
Kim served with the Chinese Communist Army in 1930s and 1940s. Cha-soo Kim served as a liaison to the Kim Il-sung anti-Japanese guerrilla group, and after the formal establishment of the North Korean state he served in various positions in the Korean People's Army. In 1968 he was promoted to lieutenant general, in 1986 to 3 star general, in 1990 to Army General and in 1998 to Vice Marshal.  He also served as a delegate to the Supreme People's Assembly from the 4th convocation in 1967, through the 5th, 6th, 7th, 8th, 9th, 10th and 11th convocation in 2003. He served as the director of the Red Flag Mangyongdae Revolutionary School.

Works

References

1916 births
2008 deaths
Date of birth missing
North Korean generals
Members of the 4th Supreme People's Assembly
Members of the 5th Supreme People's Assembly
Members of the 6th Supreme People's Assembly
Members of the 7th Supreme People's Assembly
Members of the 8th Supreme People's Assembly
Members of the 9th Supreme People's Assembly
Members of the 11th Supreme People's Assembly
Workers' Party of Korea politicians
People of 88th Separate Rifle Brigade
Place of death missing